The 43rd Pennsylvania House of Representatives District is located in southern Pennsylvania and has been represented since 2013 by Republican Keith Greiner.

District profile
The 43rd Pennsylvania House of Representatives District is located in Lancaster County and includes the following areas:

Akron
Earl Township
Ephrata
 Ephrata Township
Leacock Township
 New Holland
 Upper Leacock Township
 West Earl Township

Representatives

Recent election results

References

External links
District map from the United States Census Bureau
Pennsylvania House Legislative District Maps from the Pennsylvania Redistricting Commission.  
Population Data for District 43 from the Pennsylvania Redistricting Commission.

Government of Lancaster County, Pennsylvania
43